Olga Te (born 5 March 1996) is a Russian weightlifter. She won the gold medal in the women's 59kg event at the 2021 European Weightlifting Championships held in Moscow, Russia. At the time, she won the silver medal but in October 2021, this became the gold medal as original gold medalist Boyanka Kostova of Azerbaijan was banned for testing positive for traces of stanozolol. She also won the bronze medal in the women's 59kg event at the 2021 World Weightlifting Championships held in Tashkent, Uzbekistan.

Career 

In 2017, she won the bronze medal in the under-23 women's 63kg snatch event at the European Junior & U23 Weightlifting Championships held in Durrës, Albania. A year later, she won the gold medal in the under-23 women's 58kg event at the 2018 European Junior & U23 Weightlifting Championships held in Zamość, Poland. In 2018, she also competed in the women's 59 kg event at the World Weightlifting Championships in Ashgabat, Turkmenistan.

In 2019, she won the silver medal in the under-23 women's 59kg event at the European Junior & U23 Weightlifting Championships in Bucharest, Romania.

Achievements

References

External links 
 

Living people
1996 births
Place of birth missing (living people)
Russian female weightlifters
European Weightlifting Championships medalists
World Weightlifting Championships medalists
21st-century Russian women